The School District of Greenfield is a school district located in southwestern Milwaukee County, Wisconsin, which serves the City of Greenfield.

In 2012, the district selected former district educator and administrator, Lisa Elliott, to become superintendent of the school district.

History
Before Greenfield incorporated as a city in 1957, there were a number of school districts throughout the town for neighborhood elementary schools. Parents could pick which high school in Milwaukee County they wanted to send their children. But in the late 1950s, changes in state law and overfilled high schools meant that Greenfield needed to build a high school of its own. This task was made difficult as the surrounding municipalities of Milwaukee, West Allis, West Milwaukee, Hales Corners, and Greendale continued to carve out pieces of the Town of Greenfield. Every annexation required the school districts affected to pay money to the annexing municipality, draining coffers. In the late 1950s, Greenfield incorporated as a city and the several small school districts consolidated into two: Whitnall School District and Greenfield School District.

Passage of two referendums allowed for major additions and improvements to Greenfield High School that included a new performing arts center, fitness center, academic wing, and swimming pool. After the 2010 construction was completed, district offices were combined with the high school complex.

Schools
Greenfield High School
Greenfield Middle School
Edgewood Elementary
Elm Dale Elementary
Glenwood Elementary 
Maple Grove Elementary

Former schools
 Badger Elementary (was on Coldspring Road west of 27th Street)
 Chapman Elementary (was north of Layton just west of 84th Street; demolished for 84South commercial development) 
 Hillcrest Elementary

School board
The Greenfield School Board consists of seven members. Each member is compensated $4,500 annually and can serve an unlimited number of three-year terms.

2022-2023 Members

See also
List of school districts in Wisconsin
List of high schools in Wisconsin

References

External links

District Boundaries
Greenfield Education Foundation
District Administration

School districts in Wisconsin
Education in Milwaukee County, Wisconsin
School districts established in 1957